William Daniel Sullivan (born 1950) is a retired United States Navy officer who served as the U.S. military representative to the North Atlantic Treaty Organization.

Sullivan also served as Vice Director for Strategic Plans and Policy on the Joint Staff, and as Director to the U.S. Pacific Command for Strategy and Plans. He commanded  during Operations Desert Shield and Desert Storm and  during Persian Gulf combat operations.

Education
 Bachelor's degree from Florida State University in 1972.
 Master's degree in national security studies from Georgetown University in 1990.
 Master's degree in national security strategy from the National War College in 1994.

References

External links

Official Profile
FSU Veterans Advancement Board bio

1950 births
Living people
Place of birth missing (living people)
Florida State University alumni
Walsh School of Foreign Service alumni
National War College alumni
Recipients of the Legion of Merit
United States Navy admirals